Furia Roja Fútbol Club is a Mexican professional football team based in Jesús María, Jalisco, Mexico currently playing in Liga de Balompié Mexicano.

History 
The team was originally founded in 2007 under the name Club Rojos de Jesús María, playing in the Third division. With this name the club competed until 2010. Subsequently, football was maintained in the town with amateur-type teams.

In June 2020, the Liga de Balompié Mexicano updated its list of teams in the process of affiliation for its first season, a team based in the town appeared on the list but without knowing the name. Finally, on June 23, the presence of the new club, called Furia Roja, was confirmed, the team was the 11th confirmed franchise in the new league. Grupo Radiorama, a media company, took over the team so that it could participate in the competition.

On July 10, the club's technical staff was announced, headed by Andrés Edmundo González as manager and Eustacio Rizo as his assistant. Isaac Díaz and Edgar Morales were the first two players announced by the club.

Stadium 
The Estadio Ramírez Nogales  is situated in Jesús María, Jalisco, and is the ground of Furia Roja F.C. which plays in the Liga de Balompié Mexicano. It has the capacity to hold 1,500 spectators. The stadium will undergo a remodeling process to reach a capacity of 5,000 spectators, the minimum capacity required by the Liga de Balompié Mexicano.

Players

First-team squad

References

Association football clubs established in 2007
2007 establishments in Mexico
Football clubs in Jalisco
Liga de Balompié Mexicano Teams